Carmine Giordano (born 20 March 1982) is an Italian football player. He plays in the role of midfielder for Palazzolo.

Club career
He played most of his career in Serie C2, with teams such as Nocerina, Legnano and Pescina.

He joined Palazzolo on 28 August 2018.

See also
Football in Italy
List of football clubs in Italy

References

External links
 
 

1982 births
Footballers from Naples
Living people
Italian footballers
Association football midfielders
A.S.D. Nocerina 1910 players
A.C. Legnano players
U.S. Siracusa players
Trapani Calcio players
Cosenza Calcio players
U.S. Gavorrano players
Serie C players
Serie D players